Arturo Salah Cassani (born 4 December 1949) is a Chilean former footballer and manager. From January 2016 until 2019 he was the president of Asociación Nacional de Fútbol Profesional.

He studied civil engineering at the Pontifical Catholic University of Chile.

Manager career

He began his managerial career with Colo-Colo. He won two national championships (1986 & 1989), finished runner-up twice (1987 & 1988), and won the Copa Chile three times with Colo-Colo. After that impressive run with Colo-Colo, Salah took charge of the Chile national team from 1990 to 1993. In 1991, he led "La Roja" to a third place in the Copa America. He stayed in charged of "La Roja" for 30 games, of which he won 12, tied 7, and lost 11.

After that he was hired as the coach of Universidad de Chile. His first stint with the team lasted one year before he moved to coach Monterrey.

In 2001, Salah was hired as National Director of Chiledeportes, turning back to coaching in 2003. In Huachipato Salah raised the team's level of play and reached the 2006 Copa Sudamerica, being eliminated by Colo-Colo. He stayed with the team until 2007 when he was hired by Universidad de Chile.

In his career, he has coached 421 games, won 209, tied 124, and lost 88.

Honours

Player

Club
Universidad de Chile
 Copa Chile: 1979

Manager

Club
Colo-Colo
 Primera División de Chile (2): 1986, 1989
 Copa Chile (3): 1988, 1989, 1990

References

External links

1949 births
Living people
Chilean people of Palestinian descent
Chilean people of Italian descent
Footballers from Santiago
Chilean footballers
Chilean Primera División players
Primera B de Chile players
Audax Italiano footballers
Club Deportivo Universidad Católica footballers
Universidad de Chile footballers
Club Deportivo Palestino footballers
Association football defenders
Chilean football managers
Chilean expatriate football managers
Colo-Colo managers
Chile national football team managers
Universidad de Chile managers
C.F. Monterrey managers
Cobreloa managers
Huachipato managers
Santiago Wanderers managers
Chilean Primera División managers
Liga MX managers
Chilean expatriate sportspeople in Mexico
Expatriate football managers in Mexico
1991 Copa América managers
1993 Copa América managers
Pontifical Catholic University of Chile alumni
Presidents of the ANFP